Cyrus Spink (March 24, 1793 – May 31, 1859) was an American politician who served as a U.S. Representative from Ohio for three month in 1859 prior to his death in office.

Biography 
Born in Berkshire County, Massachusetts, Spink moved to Stark County, Ohio, in 1815.
He taught school for several years in Kendal, Ohio.
He was appointed deputy surveyor of Wayne County in October 1815 and served until December 1816.
County surveyor from 1816 to 1821, serving also for a time as district surveyor.
County auditor in 1820 and 1821.
He served as member of the State house of representatives in 1821 and 1822.
He was employed in the register's office at Wooster 1822-1824.
He was appointed register by President Monroe in 1824.
Reappointed by President Adams in 1828 and served until 1832.
He engaged in mercantile pursuits in Wooster.
Presidential elector in 1844 for Clay/Frelinghuysen.
He served as member of the State board of equalization in 1846.
He served as delegate to the Whig National Convention in 1852.
He was appointed by Governor Chase one of the directors of the Ohio Penitentiary in 1856.

Spink was elected as a Republican to the Thirty-sixth Congress and served from March 4, 1859, until his death in Wooster, Ohio, on May 31, 1859.
He was interred in Wooster Cemetery.

He was married to Nancy Campbell Beall, daughter of General Reasin Beall, February 19, 1819. They had six children. Spink was a Baptist.

See also

List of United States Congress members who died in office (1790–1899)

Sources

External links
 

1793 births
1859 deaths
American surveyors
County auditors in the United States
Members of the Ohio House of Representatives
People from Berkshire County, Massachusetts
People from Wooster, Ohio
Ohio Whigs
19th-century American politicians
1844 United States presidential electors
Baptists from Massachusetts
Baptists from Ohio
19th-century Baptists
Republican Party members of the United States House of Representatives from Ohio
19th-century American businesspeople